Encyclopedia of Pseudoscience may refer to:

Encyclopedia of Pseudoscience: From Alien Abductions to Zone Therapy (2000), by William F. Williams
The Skeptic Encyclopedia of Pseudoscience (2002), edited by Michael Shermer and Pat Linse